KFMT-FM (105.5 FM) is a radio station broadcasting an adult contemporary format. Licensed to Fremont, Nebraska, United States, the station serves the Fremont area with fringe coverage to west Omaha. The station is currently owned by Steven W. Seline, through licensee Walnut Radio, LLC.

References

External links

Fremont, Nebraska
Mainstream adult contemporary radio stations in the United States
FMT-FM
Radio stations established in 1987